Central Rio (German: Zentrale Rio) is a 1939 German crime film directed by Erich Engels and starring Leny Marenbach, Camilla Horn and Ita Rina.

The film's sets were designed by the art director Willi Herrmann. It was shot at the Terra Studios in Berlin and on location in Hamburg.

Synopsis
A German woman's husband has been missing for years, presumed dead. Then she receives information that is alive and living in Brazil. She resolves to travel to Rio de Janeiro to find out the truth.

Cast
 Leny Marenbach as Maria Halmborg 
 Camilla Horn as Diane Mercier 
 Ita Rina as Chiquita Salieri 
 Werner Fuetterer as Michael Wenk 
 Iván Petrovich as Ricardo Perez 
 Hans Zesch-Ballot as Kommissar Dossa 
 Leo Peukert as Kommissar Gaveira 
 Paul Hoffmann as Marquez Cabana 
 Reinhold Bernt as Sergeant Carmo 
 Axel Monjé as Sergeant Gonzaga
 Käte Kühl as Bonita 
 Walther Süssenguth as Schmuggler 
 Marianne Simson as Solotänzerin 
 Else Ehser as Garderobiere 
 Helmut Egiomue as Hotelboy Chico 
 Rudi Schuricke as Sänger

References

Bibliography 
 Noack, Frank. Veit Harlan: The Life and Work of a Nazi Filmmaker. University Press of Kentucky, 2016.
 Tegel, Susan. Jew Suss: Life, Legend, Fiction, Film. A&C Black, 2011.

External links 
 

1939 films
1939 crime films
German crime films
Films of Nazi Germany
1930s German-language films
Films directed by Erich Engels
German black-and-white films
Terra Film films
Films shot in Hamburg
Films set in Brazil
Films set in Rio de Janeiro (city)
Films based on crime novels
Films based on German novels
1930s German films
Films shot at Terra Studios